Carlo Alessandro Zisa (born 11 April 1965 in Cortina d'Ampezzo) is an Italian curler and curling coach.

At the national level, he is an eight-time Italian men's champion curler and a 2012 Italian mixed champion curler.

Since 2011 he is a president of the Curling Club Dolomiti in Cortina d'Ampezzo.

Teams

Men's

Mixed

Record as a coach of national teams

References

External links

Video: 

Living people
1965 births
People from Cortina d'Ampezzo
Italian male curlers
Italian curling champions
Italian curling coaches
Sportspeople from the Province of Belluno